Syed Wahiduzzaman Diamond is a Bangladeshi filmmaker. He won Bangladesh National Film Award for Best Director for his direction of the film Gangajatra (2009).

Career
In 2006, Diamond directed a film Nacholer Rani, based on the life of the peasant activist Ila Mitra. He directed Gangajatra in 2009 which won National Film Awards in eight categories and Bachsas Awards in seven categories.

Awards
 Atandra Padak (2010)
 Bangladesh National Film Award for Best Director (2009)

Works
 Nacholer Rani (2006)
 Gangajatra (2009)
 Antordhan (2013)
 Shesh Kotha (2017)
 COVID-19 in Bangladesh
 Rohingya (2022)

References

External links

Living people
Bangladeshi film directors
Best Director National Film Award (Bangladesh) winners
Best Story National Film Award (Bangladesh) winners
Year of birth missing (living people)
Place of birth missing (living people)